Northvolt AB is a Swedish battery developer and manufacturer, specialising in lithium-ion technology for electric vehicles.

History 
The company was founded as SGF Energy in 2015 by Peter Carlsson (now chief executive), who was formerly an executive at Tesla Motors. In 2017, the company changed its name to Northvolt. It was founded with the aim to supply the automotive industry with electric vehicle batteries. In May 2019, the European Investment Bank offered a loan of 3.5 billion SEK (about €350 million). Maroš Šefčovič, the European Commissioner for Energy at the time, said that "I welcome the significant support proposed by the EIB to Northvolt gigafactory as a stepping-stone towards building a competitive, sustainable and innovative value chain, with battery cells manufactured at scale, here, in Europe."

In June of the same year, companies such as the BMW Group, Volkswagen Group, Goldman Sachs and Folksam announced that they would invest in the company. In total, the investments amounted to 1 billion US dollars, framed as a way to challenge what was reported as the dominance of Tesla, Inc. and Asian companies such as Toyota and Nissan on the market for electric vehicle batteries. The company started building a battery factory in Skellefteå, Sweden, with the aim to start production of electric vehicle batteries in 2021. The first battery in Skellefteå was assembled in December 2021, and the production for commercial uses is planned to start in 2022.

In 2019, Volkswagen and Northvolt announced that a second factory would be built in Salzgitter, Germany, aiming to start production in 2023–2024. The aim was to start production at 16 GWh, and increase it to 24 GWh. In May 2020, Volkswagen announced that it would build the factory largely on its own, and invest 450 million euros in the construction. On 16 July 2020, it was announced that Northvolt and BMW had signed a deal of 2 billion euros, for Northvolt to deliver batteries starting from 2024.

On 30 July 2020, a €350 million loan was issued to Northvolt by the European Investment Bank with the backing of the European Union's InnovFin programme to build a demonstration line for a new type of battery which it started producing at the end of 2019. As part of the Investment Plan for Europe, Northvolt received a $350 million loan for its Skellefteå factory from the EIB, using the guarantee of the European Fund for Strategic Investments.

News website EURACTIV stated in an article that "Northvolt is quickly building a reputation as the EU’s go-to company for home-grown batteries." On the same day, it was announced that Northvolt had been issued loans amounting to US$1.6 billion from a consortium of commercial banks, pension funds and other financial institutions.

Manufacturing sites 
Northvolt has a factory in Skellefteå, northern Sweden, part of Northvolt's plan to increase production capacity of 32 gigawatt-hours by 2023. Its headquarters for research and development is in Västerås, Sweden.

The opening of a factory in Skellefteå was said to potentially transform subarctic Sweden, and dramatically change the city. It was however said that it could be a potential risk with shortage of qualified labour in the region. The factory will be the largest in Swedish history, creating challenges for newcomers and the existing community. As the energy-hungry battery plant is strategically sited near renewable energy sites, part of the company's stated goal to make "the greenest cell on Earth".

In late December 2021, the company announced that the Skellefteå Northvolt Ett ("One") gigafactory, with 500 workers, had produced its first batch of prismatic cells, as part of its machinery commissioning process. Factory completion and initial customer shipments are expected in 2022. The company projects battery output of 16 gigawatt hours (GWh), enough for ~300,000 EVs, by 2024. With full production lines and staffing, the plant expects to produce 60 GWh of batteries with 3,000 employees.

References

External links 
 

Swedish companies established in 2015
Electric vehicle battery manufacturers
Manufacturing companies based in Stockholm
Battery manufacturers